Algiers Province (or ) is a province (wilayah) in Algeria, named after its capital, Algiers, which is also the national capital. It is adopted from the old French department of Algiers and has a population of about 8 million. It is the most densely populated province of Algeria, and also the smallest by area.

Territory
In 1984, Boumerdès Province and Tipaza Province were carved out of its territory.

Administrative divisions

Algiers province is coincident with the city of Algiers, and is divided into 13 districts, in turn subdivided into 57 communes or municipalities.

Districts
The districts, listed according to official numbering (from west to east), are:

Communes
The communes are:

 Aïn Taya (Ain-Taya)
 Bab El Oued
 Bab Ezzouar
 Baba Hassen
 Bachdjerrah (Bach Djerrah)
 Bologhine (Bouloghine)
 Bordj El Bahri
 Bordj El Kiffan (Bordj El Kifan)
 Bourouba
 Casbah
 Dar El Beïda
 Douéra
 Draria
 El Achour
 El Harrach
 El Magharia
 El Marsa
 H'raoua
 Hussein Dey
 Khraïcia
 Kouba
 Mahelma
 Mohamed Belouizdad
 Mohammedia
 Oued Koriche
 Oued Smar
 Rahmania
 Raïs Hamidou
 Reghaïa
 Rouïba
 Souidania
 Staouéli
 Zéralda
 El Khroub

Neighbourhoods
The neighbourhoods, listed alphabetically, are:

 
 
 Casbah of Algiers
 
 
 Cité Yahia Boushaki
 
 Diar el Mahçoul
 
 
 
 
 
 
 
 
 
 
 
 Tamentfoust

History

Ottoman Algeria

 Bombardment of Algiers (1682)
 Bombardment of Algiers (1683)

French conquest

 Invasion of Algiers (14 June 1830)
 Battle of Staouéli (18 June 1830)
 Massacre of El Ouffia (6 April 1832)
 First Raid on Reghaïa (8 May 1837)

Independence Revolution

 Battle of Algiers  (1956–57)
 Battle of Bab El Oued (23 March 1962)
 Villa Susini

Salafist terrorism

 List of terrorist incidents in 2007
 2007 Algiers bombings (11 April 2007)
 2007 Algiers bombings (11 December 2007)

Religion

Mosques

Cemeteries

Zawiyas

Zawiya Thaalibia in Algiers.
 in Algiers.
 in Algiers.
 in Algiers.
 in Algiers.

Education

,

Demography

Notable people

References

External links
  "Alger, Capitale previligiée pour l'investissement" (Archive) - National Agency of Investment Development (Agence Nationale de Développement de l'Investissement or ANDI, الوكالة الوطنية لتطوير الاستثمار)

 
Provinces of Algeria
States and territories established in 1974